Barco is a civil parish in the municipality of Guimarães in the Braga District of Portugal. The population in 2021 was 1,439, in an area of 3.02 km2.

References

Freguesias of Guimarães